Eugenio Lerdo de Tejada (c.1720 – c.1800) was a Spanish merchant and politician, who held various public positions in Buenos Aires during the colonial period, including like mayor and regidor of the city.

Biography 

He was born in Nájera, La Rioja, Spain, and was married in Buenos Aires to María Josefa Bustillo de Zeballos, daughter of Ignacio de Bustillos y Zeballos and Ana Domíguez Rabanal, belonging to a distinguished family.

Eugenio Lerdo de Tejada was appointed as procurator of Buenos Aires in 1762, and served for two terms as mayor of first vote of Buenos Aires, elected in 1761 and 1764. He also served as Corregidor of Oruro during the viceroyalty of José Manso de Velasco.

References 

1720s births
1790s deaths
Mayors of Buenos Aires
Spanish colonial governors and administrators
Spanish nobility
18th-century Spanish businesspeople
Río de la Plata
Politicians from Buenos Aires